Dale McMullin (born March 13, 1955) is a Canadian former ice hockey player. McMullin was born in Procter, British Columbia, but grew up in Nelson, British Columbia.

McMullin played at junior level with the Brandon Wheat Kings at scored over 100 points in a season twice.  He was drafted 116th overall in the 1975 NHL Amateur Draft by the Atlanta Flames and 95th overall in the 1975 WHA Amateur Draft by the Phoenix Roadrunners.  He however never played in the National Hockey League and played just one game in the World Hockey Association for the Edmonton Oilers.

External links
 

1955 births
Living people
Atlanta Flames draft picks
Canadian ice hockey left wingers
Edmonton Oilers (WHA) players
Ice hockey people from British Columbia
People from Nelson, British Columbia
Phoenix Roadrunners draft picks
Tucson Rustlers players